Daejeon Station is a station of the Daejeon Metro Line 1 in Jeong-dong, Dong District, Daejeon, South Korea.

External links
  Daejeon Station from Daejeon Metropolitan Express Transit Corporation

Daejeon Metro stations
Dong District, Daejeon
Railway stations opened in 2006